The 1970 FIFA World Cup was the ninth edition of the FIFA World Cup, the quadrennial international football championship for men's senior national teams. Held from 31 May to 21 June in Mexico, it was the first World Cup tournament held outside Europe and South America, and it was also the first held in North America. Teams representing 75 nations from all six populated continents entered the competition, and its qualification rounds began in May 1968. Fourteen teams qualified from this process to join host nation Mexico and defending champions England in the 16-team final tournament. El Salvador, Israel and Morocco made their debut appearances at the final stage.

The tournament final had Brazil battle Italy, another FIFA two-time champion (and UEFA Euro 1968 winner), 4–1. Furthermore, during the tournament, Brazil also had to defeat another two-time champion (who were) South American champions Uruguay, by 3–1 in the semi-final, and defending champions England 1–0 in the group stage. This is currently the only time that the winning team defeated the European and South American champions alongside the tournament's defending champions.

The win gave Brazil its third World Cup title, which allowed them to permanently keep the Jules Rimet Trophy, and a new trophy was introduced in 1974. The victorious team, led by Carlos Alberto and featuring players such as Pelé, Gérson, Jairzinho, Rivellino, and Tostão, is often cited as the greatest football team of all time. They achieved a perfect record of wins in all six games in the finals, as well as winning all their qualifying fixtures.

Despite the issues of altitude and high temperature, the finals largely produced attacking football which created an average goals per game record not since bettered by any subsequent World Cup Finals. With the advancements in satellite communications, the 1970 Finals attracted a new record television audience for the FIFA World Cup as games were broadcast live around the world and, in a few cases, in colour—the first time that this was the case.

Host selection 

Mexico was chosen as the host nation on 8 October 1964 vote at the FIFA congress in Tokyo, where the only other bid submitted was by Argentina. The latter would host the 1978 World Cup. The 1970 selection of Mexico as host would mark several distinctions. It was the first World Cup that was staged in North America and the first to be staged outside of South America and Europe. Further distinction would come to Mexico at the 1986 World Cup when it was the only country that twice staged a World Cup when it stepped in as a substitute after Colombia was struggling financially.

Qualification 

A total of 75 teams entered the 1970 FIFA World Cup, and 73 were required to qualify. Due to rejected entries and withdrawals, 68 teams eventually participated in the qualifying stages, including eight for the first time. Mexico as the host nation and England as reigning World Cup champions were granted automatic qualification, with the remaining 14 finals places divided among the continental confederations.

Eight places were available to teams from UEFA (Europe), three for CONMEBOL (South America), one for CAF (Africa), one for a team from either the AFC or the OFC (Asia/Oceania), and one for CONCACAF (North and Central America and Caribbean). A place in the finals for an African representative was guaranteed for the first time, as a response to the mass boycott of the qualifying process for 1966 by the African entrants after FIFA linked Africa, Asia and Oceania together with only one qualifying place on offer.

The draw for the qualifying stages was conducted on 1 February 1968 in Casablanca, Morocco, with matches beginning in May 1968 and the final fixtures being concluded in December 1969. North Korea, quarter-finalists at the previous tournament, were disqualified during the process after refusing to play in Israel for political reasons. El Salvador qualified for the finals after beating Honduras in a play-off match, which was the catalyst for a four-day conflict in July 1969 known as the Football War.

Half of the eventual qualifying teams had also been present at the previous World Cup, but three teams qualified for the first time: El Salvador, Israel and Morocco, while Peru, Romania, Belgium and Sweden made their first World Cup appearances since 1930, 1938, 1954 and 1958 respectively. Czechoslovakia returned to the World Cup stage after missing out in 1966.

As of 2022, this was the only time Israel qualified for a FIFA World Cup finals, and also the only time Argentina failed to qualify (they declined to participate in 1938, 1950 and 1954). Chile, Spain and Switzerland all did not qualify for the first time since 1958, while Hungary did not qualify for the first time since 1950. France also failed to qualify, as did Portugal after finishing in third place at the 1966 tournament.

List of qualified teams

The following 16 teams qualified for the final tournament.

AFC (1)
  
CAF (1)
  
OFC (0)
 None qualified

CONCACAF (2)
  
  (hosts) 
CONMEBOL (3)
  
  
  

UEFA (9)
  
  
  
  (holders)

Venues 
Five stadiums in five cities were selected to host the World Cup matches. Alternative venues in Hidalgo state and the port city of Veracruz were also considered. Each group was based solely in one city with exception of Group 2, which was staged in both Puebla and Toluca. Aside from the Estadio Luis Dosal, all the stadia had only been constructed during the 1960s, as Mexico prepared to host both the World Cup and the 1968 Summer Olympics. The stadium construction cost for the four smaller venues were around US$11 million, while the final stadium in Mexico City cost US$20 million.

The altitude of the venues varied and the importance of acclimatisation was strongly considered by all the participating teams. As a result, in contrast to the previous tournament staged in England, most teams arrived in the region well in advance of their opening fixtures to prepare for this factor. Some teams had already experienced the local conditions when competing in the football competition at 1968 Summer Olympics. In addition to the altitude, all five locations had hot and rainy weather where temperatures would regularly go past 32 °C (90 °F).

Of the five stadia used for the 32 matches played, the largest and most utilised venue was the Azteca Stadium in Mexico City, which hosted 10 total matches including the final and third place matches, and all of Group 1's matches (which included all of host Mexico's matches). The Jalisco Stadium in Guadalajara hosted eight matches including all of Group 3's matches and a semi-final. The Nou Camp Stadium in Leon hosted seven matches, which consisted of all of Group 4's matches and a quarter-final match. The Luis Dosal stadium in Toluca hosted four matches, and Cuauhtémoc stadium in Puebla hosted three matches and was the only stadium of the five used for this tournament not to host any knockout rounds.

Format

The 16 qualified teams were divided into four groups of four. Each group was played as a single round-robin in which each team would play each of the others in their group once. Teams were ranked by the number of points earned from their matches (two points were awarded for a win and one for a draw), and goal difference was used as the primary tie-breaker; if two teams finished level on both points and goal difference, lots were drawn to separate them. This method was used to separate the top two teams in Group 1 (Soviet Union and Mexico), but it was not used to separate Bulgaria and Morocco in Group 4, despite them finishing level on points and goal difference, as their final positions did not have any implications for the knockout stage.

The top two teams from each group progressed to the knockout stage. In all knockout matches, extra time was played if the teams were drawn after 90 minutes. If teams were still tied after extra-time, drawing of lots would have been used in all matches other than the final. FIFA did not announce in advance what would happen if the final itself were to be drawn after extra time. In the event, all knockout matches were decided in either regular time or extra time.

Final draw 
Although it was reported in the build-up to the final draw that seedings would be used, as had been the case at the previous two World Cup Finals, the FIFA Organising Committee ultimately announced on the same day of the draw, that there would be no seeding of teams due to failed attempts to reach a compromise for the seeding criteria. Instead, the 16 qualified teams were divided into four pots comprising 'geographical groupings' decided by a vote of the FIFA Organising Committee, which for the composition of pot 1, 3 and 4 also took into account the teams' strengths and even political considerations. The tournament structure ensured that teams grouped within the same pot would not meet each other before the quarterfinals at the earliest. The system of politically decided pots hereby ensured that Israel and Morocco would not be drawn to face each other after Morocco had earlier threatened to withdraw from the tournament, as they had done from the Olympic football tournament two years earlier, if that were the case.

The draw was staged in Mexico City, Mexico on 10 January 1970 in the Maria Isabel Hotel, which served as FIFA's headquarters during the competition. The teams were drawn into the four groups, which had their locations defined in advance: Group 1 being staged in Mexico City, Group 2 in Puebla and Toluca, Group 3 in Guadalajara and Group 4 in León. Ahead of the draw, the FIFA regulations had predetermined that the hosts Mexico would be in Group 1 and so based in the capital city, and that England as holders would be based together with Group 3 in Guadalajara, the tournament's second largest stadium. Keeping the defending champion (holders) apart from meeting the hosts in the group stage either by seeding or predetermined group positions, was a practiced tradition throughout the history of the FIFA World Cup, with 1934 and 1954 being the only two exceptions.

The 10-year-old daughter of Guillermo Cañedo, president of the Mexican Football Federation and chief of the FIFA Organising Committee, drew out the teams from four silver cups, so that each of the four groups featured one drawn team respectively from pot 1, pot 2, pot 3 and pot 4.

Match officials 

AFC
  Abraham Klein

CAF
  Seyoum Tarekegn
  Ali Kandil

CONCACAF
  Werner Winsemann
  Abel Aguilar Elizalde
  Diego De Leo
  Henry Landauer

CONMEBOL
  Ángel Norberto Coerezza
  Antônio de Moraês
  Rafael Hormázabal
  Arturo Yamasaki
  Ramón Barreto

UEFA
  Ferdinand Marschall
  Vital Loraux
  Rudi Glöckner
  Jack Taylor

  Roger Machin
  Antonio Sbardella
  Laurens van Ravens
  Antonio Ribeiro Saldanha
  Andrei Rădulescu
  Bob Davidson
  Ortiz de Mendíbil
  Tofik Bakhramov
  Rudolf Scheurer
  Kurt Tschenscher

Squads 

A tournament squad was limited to no more than 22 players; Morocco named only 19 players in their squad.

Tournament review

Group stage 

Following the opening ceremony host nation Mexico faced the Soviet Union; this was the last time until the 2006 World Cup that the host nation's first match rather than the World Cup holders' began the tournament. Both this opening match of Group 1 and many others during the competition kicked off at noon for the benefit of European television schedules, meaning play under the midday sun. The match produced a goalless draw, prompting some media to predict the entire tournament would be played at the slow tempo that featured in this game given the conditions involved. Following the half-time interval Anatoliy Puzach became the first substitute to be used in FIFA World Cup history as the Soviets made use of the new competition rule. Both teams won their remaining two games to progress from the group at the expense of Belgium and World Cup debutants El Salvador.

Group 2 was the lowest-scoring of the groups with only six goals in its six matches as Uruguay, reigning South America champions, and Italy, the reigning European champions, edged past Sweden and Israel. Sweden would have progressed if they had produced a two-goal victory against Uruguay in their final game, but it was not until the final minute that they scored the only goal of the game. Hours before the game FIFA elected to replace the scheduled referee after bribery rumours – later dismissed by FIFA – arose in Mexico. The 1–0 result meant Uruguay advanced, to be joined by Italy after they avoided defeat in the group finale against Israel.

Owing to the lack of a seeding system, Group 3 allowed the reigning World Cup holders England to be paired together with the two-time former champion Brazil, considered by many the pre-tournament favourites for the trophy. England's preparations were hampered by the arrest of their captain Bobby Moore in Colombia for allegedly stealing a bracelet from a jeweller's shop; the charges were later dropped. The attitude of their manager Alf Ramsey and the English media in general was perceived by many locals as unfriendly and xenophobic toward Mexico's hosting of the competition, which meant the English team received a largely hostile response during the competition.

With both having won their opening games – against Czechoslovakia and Romania, respectively – Brazil met England in the group's most famed match. Although Gordon Banks in the English goal denied Pelé from close range with a reflex save that Pelé himself cited as the greatest of his career, a second half goal from Jairzinho won the match for Brazil, after which England squandered several excellent opportunities to equalise. Both teams then won their final group games to progress to the knockout stage.

Play in Group 4 began with Bulgaria taking a two-goal lead against Peru, but a second half comeback gave the South Americans a 3–2 victory. Morocco, the first African World Cup representatives since 1934, also began strongly by taking the lead against the 1966 runners-up West Germany, but the Germans came back to win 2–1. West Germany also went behind against Bulgaria in their second match, but a Gerd Müller hat-trick helped them recover and win 5–2; the eventual Golden Boot winner Müller hit another hat-trick – the only hat-tricks of the entire tournament. – to win the group against Peru.

Knockout stage

Quarter-finals
Mexico and the Soviet Union had finished tied at the top of Group 1 on both points and goal difference, meaning that the drawing of lots was required to rank them. On 12 June, the draw allocated the Soviet Union the group winners' berth, meaning that they would face Uruguay at the Estadio Azteca, while the host nation were paired against Italy in the smaller Toluca venue. Mexican officials unsuccessfully appealed to FIFA to stage their game in the capital to avoid traffic problems. The hosts took the lead against Italy with a José Luis González goal, but his teammate Javier Guzmán equalised with an own goal before half-time. Italy then dominated the second half to progress to the semi-finals with a 4–1 win. The Soviet Union were also eliminated in their quarter-final when a Víctor Espárrago header three minutes from the end of extra-time sent Uruguay through. The Soviets had stopped play during Uruguay's attack leading to the goal, believing that the ball had crossed the touchline.

The all-South America tie in Guadalajara was the highest-scoring of the four quarter-finals as Brazil recorded a 4–2 triumph over Peru. The match is considered to be one of the most entertaining matches in World Cup history: Brazil shot 27 times; Peru, 22. Next came a rematch of the previous World Cup final between England and West Germany that took place in León. The reigning champions took a two-goal lead, but Franz Beckenbauer halved the deficit when his low shot beat England's second-choice goalkeeper Peter Bonetti, who was playing after Gordon Banks suffered food poisoning the day before. Eight minutes from time, an Uwe Seeler header levelled the score. England's Geoff Hurst then had an apparently legitimate goal ruled out for offside. An extra-time goal from Gerd Müller brought (West) Germany's first-ever competitive victory over England.

Semi-finals

All four of the semi-finalists were former world champions, with the line-up guaranteeing a final between Europe and South America. In the all-South American tie, controversially switched from the capital to the lower altitude of Guadalajara, Brazil came from behind to defeat Uruguay 3–1 and earn the right to contest their fourth World Cup Final. Two Brazilian goals in the final 15 minutes decided a match that had been evenly-matched until that point. The all-European meeting between Italy and West Germany produced a match regarded by many as one of the greatest World Cup games of all time. Having led from the eighth minute through Roberto Boninsegna's strike, Italy were pegged back in injury time when sweeper Karl-Heinz Schnellinger scored his only international goal. Extra-time brought five more goals as the lead swung between the two sides until Gianni Rivera gave the Azzurri a decisive 4–3 lead. The match subsequently became known as the "Game of the Century", and today has a plaque outside the Estadio Azteca to commemorate it. West Germany went on to defeat Uruguay 1–0 in the third-place match.

Final
In the final, Brazil opened the scoring when Pelé headed in a cross from Rivellino in the 18th minute, but Roberto Boninsegna equalised for Italy after a series of blunders in the Brazilian defence. The match remained level until the 65th minute when a powerful shot from Gérson restored the Brazilians' lead. Further goals from Jairzinho and Carlos Alberto rewarded Brazil's attacking play and secured a 4–1 victory and a record third World Cup triumph, which earned them the right to permanently keep the Jules Rimet Trophy.

Legacy 

Both the Brazilian team that were crowned champions of the 1970 World Cup and the tournament itself have become regarded as among the very finest in the history of the FIFA World Cup. In contrast to the more physical style of play that had dominated the previous two tournaments, the 1970 Finals are noted for the attacking play adopted by most teams.

For the first time at a World Cup Finals, referees could issue yellow and red cards (a system that is now commonplace at every level of football worldwide), yet, in contrast to the previous tournaments (besides the 1950 edition) and all subsequent tournaments to date, no player was expelled from play. The officiating of the opening match, commentated by some media as overly strict, set a standard of discipline that instead helped protect skillful players in accordance with FIFA's stated wish. The tournament's average of 2.97 goals per game set a level not since bettered.

The eventual champions Brazil, led by Carlos Alberto, and featuring Pelé, Clodoaldo, Gérson, Jairzinho, Rivellino, and Tostão, is often cited as the greatest-ever World Cup team. They won all of their six games on the way to the title, and had also won every one of their qualifying fixtures. Jairzinho's feat of scoring in every finals match likewise has yet to be equalled. Coach Mário Zagallo became the first man to win the World Cup as both a player (1958, 1962) and coach.

This was the first World Cup to use the Telstar ball from Adidas (who have supplied every World Cup match ball to date), introduced as the "Telstar Erlast" for the 1968 European Football Championship. The Telstar was the first World Cup ball to use the now-familiar truncated icosahedron for its design, consisting of 12 black pentagonal and 20 white hexagonal panels. The 32-panel configuration had been introduced in 1962 by Select Sport, and was also used in the official logo for the 1970 World Cup. The black-and-white pattern, to aid visibility on black and white television broadcasts (which was still commonplace then, as colour television was rare in many parts of the world), was also well established before the Telstar. The name came from the Telstar communications satellite, which was roughly spherical and dotted with solar panels, somewhat similar in appearance to the football.

Merchandise
Forming a partnership with FIFA in 1970, Panini published its first FIFA World Cup sticker album for the 1970 World Cup, initiating a global craze for collecting and trading stickers. In 2017, a complete 1970 World Cup Panini sticker album signed by Pelé sold for a record £10,450.

Group stage 

The first round, or group stage, saw the 16 teams divided into four groups of four teams. Each group was a round-robin of six games, where each team played one match against each of the other teams in the same group. Teams were awarded two points for a win, one point for a draw and none for a defeat. The teams finishing first and second in each group qualified for the quarter-finals, while the bottom two teams in each group were eliminated from the tournament.

Tie-breaking criteria
 Greater number of points in all group matches
 Goal difference in all group matches (replacing the previous usage of goal average)
 Drawing of lots by the FIFA Organising Committee

Group 1

Group 2

Group 3

Group 4

Knockout stage 

The eight teams that had advanced from the group stage entered a single-elimination style tournament, which also featured a third place play-off contested between the two losing semi-finalists. In this knockout stage (including the final), if a match was level at the end of 90 minutes, extra time of two periods (15 minutes each) would be played. In matches prior to the final, if the score was still level after extra time then a coin toss by the referee would determine the winner. If the final was still level after 120 minutes' play then the match would instead be replayed at a later date.

All times listed local (UTC−6)

Quarter-finals

Semi-finals

Match for third place

Final

Statistics

Goalscorers 

With 10 goals, Gerd Müller was the top scorer in the tournament. In total, 95 goals were scored by 55 players, with only one of them credited as own goal.

10 goals
  Gerd Müller

7 goals
  Jairzinho

5 goals
  Teófilo Cubillas

4 goals
  Pelé
  Anatoliy Byshovets

3 goals
  Rivellino
  Gigi Riva
  Uwe Seeler

2 goals

  Raoul Lambert
  Wilfried Van Moer
  Tostão
  Ladislav Petráš
  Roberto Boninsegna
  Gianni Rivera
  Javier Valdivia
  Alberto Gallardo
  Florea Dumitrache

1 goal

  Carlos Alberto
  Clodoaldo
  Gérson
  Hristo Bonev
  Dinko Dermendzhiev
  Todor Kolev
  Asparuh Nikodimov
  Dobromir Zhechev
  Allan Clarke
  Geoff Hurst
  Alan Mullery
  Martin Peters
  Mordechai Spiegler
  Tarcisio Burgnich
  Angelo Domenghini
  Maouhoub Ghazouani
  Houmane Jarir
  Juan Ignacio Basaguren
  Javier Fragoso
  José Luis González
  Gustavo Peña
  Roberto Challe
  Héctor Chumpitaz
  Emerich Dembrovschi
  Alexandru Neagu
  Kakhi Asatiani
  Vitaliy Khmelnytskyi
  Ove Grahn
  Tom Turesson
  Luis Cubilla
  Víctor Espárrago
  Ildo Maneiro
  Juan Mujica
  Franz Beckenbauer
  Reinhard Libuda
  Wolfgang Overath
  Karl-Heinz Schnellinger

1 own goal
  Javier Guzmán (playing against Italy)

Awards 
 Golden Boot:  Gerd Müller (West Germany)
 Best Young Player (awarded retrospectively):  Teófilo Cubillas (Peru)
 FIFA Fair Play Trophy:

FIFA retrospective ranking 

In 1986, FIFA published a report that ranked all teams in each World Cup up to and including 1986, based on progress in the competition, overall results and quality of the opposition. The rankings for the 1970 tournament were as follows:

* Listed as #13 in one of the sources
** Listed as #12 in one of the sources

References

External links

1970 FIFA World Cup Mexico, FIFA.com
Details at RSSSF
FIFA Technical Report

 
FIFA World Cup tournaments
International association football competitions hosted by Mexico
1969–70 in Mexican football
May 1970 sports events in North America
June 1970 sports events in North America
May 1970 events in Mexico
June 1970 events in Mexico